CrDroid is a customized fork of Android based on LineageOS. It is one of the first to offer unofficial releases of Android 10, Android 11, Android 12.1 and Android 13 Custom ROMs.

History and reception 

The first releases were developed by Cristiano Matos in late 2012, for the Samsung Galaxy S3. 

The releases gained more attention in 2013, while in 2014, Saad Khan of Team Android wrote a detailed article on crDroid. 

Features and installation procedure was highlighted by Neeraj jast in 2015.  

Rafia Shaikh wrote about crDroid Marshmallow version for HTC One M7, and for HTC One M9. In 2016 Shaikh wrote about upgrading to Android 7.1.1 Nougat ROM on Samsung Galaxy S4 I9505.  

In 2015 a LineageOS-based version for the Samsung Galaxy S4 was announced. In 2017, Mathew Diekhake of ConsumingTech highlighted crDroid version 2.5 Android 7.1.1 Nougat as one of the "Best Custom ROMs" for Nextbit Robin. Rafia Shaikh wrote about obtaining a Pixel Look and Feel on the HTC One M8 with crDroid. 

2018 is the year the crDroid website was launched.  

At one point crDroid was called "[the most] beautiful Android based custom ROM" and a long list of supported devices was published. Saad Khan of TeamAndroid called crDroid a "simply pure Android experience without any other non-sense features" in an article on updating Nexus 7 (2012) to Android 7.1.2.  

Mohammed Huwais of GetDroidTips wrote a detailed article on crDroid Android 7.1.2 Nougat On General Mobile GM 5, and the list of supported devices was long. Tomek Kondrat of XDA Developers highlighted crDroid's unofficial port of LineageOS 15.1 for Honor 5X. 

In 2019, Aamir Siddiqui of XDA Developers wrote about the progress of custom development for the Xiaomi Redmi Note 7 Pro, that included crDroid, LineageOS 16 and Pixel Experience. 

Arol Wright of XDA developers highlighted availability of Android 10 with crDroid for several devices in late 2019. 

crDroid was listed with several other Android 10 ROMs in a 2019 list by Stephen Perkins of GadgetHacks.

crDroid 7 was launched on October 14, 2020, initially supporting OnePlus 5/T. 

crDroid has been listed among the best custom ROMs for Android in an article published by Nilayan Ghosh of AndroidBlog.org.

In January 2022, crDroid 8 (Android 12) was released.

According with the website blog post, October 28th 2022 is the day crDroid 9 got released.

See also 

 List of custom Android firmware

References

External links 

 
 
 

Custom Android firmware